The plumbeous antvireo (Dysithamnus plumbeus) is a species of bird in the family Thamnophilidae. It is endemic to low altitude areas of the Atlantic Forest in south east Brazil. Its natural habitat is subtropical or tropical moist lowland forests. It is threatened by habitat loss.

References

External links
Xeno-canto: audio recordings of the plumbeous antvireo
BirdLife Species Factsheet.

Dysithamnus
Birds of the Atlantic Forest
Endemic birds of Brazil
Birds described in 1831
Taxonomy articles created by Polbot